Clasterosporium is a genus of fungi in the family Magnaporthaceae.

Species

Clasterosporium abutilonis
Clasterosporium anomalum
Clasterosporium arundinaceum
Clasterosporium asclepiadis
Clasterosporium asperum
Clasterosporium bambusae
Clasterosporium biseptatum
Clasterosporium bonordenii
Clasterosporium brunneum
Clasterosporium bulbophilum
Clasterosporium caespitulosum
Clasterosporium calami
Clasterosporium capsularum
Clasterosporium caricicola
Clasterosporium caricinum
Clasterosporium caulincola
Clasterosporium celastri
Clasterosporium celatum
Clasterosporium citri
Clasterosporium clavaeforme
Clasterosporium clavatum
Clasterosporium coccolobae
Clasterosporium cocoicola
Clasterosporium coffeanum
Clasterosporium congestum
Clasterosporium convolvuli
Clasterosporium cornigerum
Clasterosporium cornutum
Clasterosporium coryphae
Clasterosporium curvatum
Clasterosporium cyperacearum
Clasterosporium cyperi
Clasterosporium diffusum
Clasterosporium domus-aliena
Clasterosporium dothideoides
Clasterosporium elasticae
Clasterosporium ellisii
Clasterosporium eocenicum
Clasterosporium epiphyllum
Clasterosporium eremita
Clasterosporium eruca
Clasterosporium flagellatum
Clasterosporium flexum
Clasterosporium fragile
Clasterosporium glomerae
Clasterosporium harknessii
Clasterosporium herculeum
Clasterosporium hirudinoides
Clasterosporium hirudo
Clasterosporium hormiscioides
Clasterosporium hydrangeae
Clasterosporium isopyri
Clasterosporium javanicum
Clasterosporium kansense
Clasterosporium lathyri
Clasterosporium leptopus
Clasterosporium ligustri
Clasterosporium lindavianum
Clasterosporium linguaeforme
Clasterosporium lini
Clasterosporium longisporum
Clasterosporium maculans
Clasterosporium maculatum
Clasterosporium magnusianum
Clasterosporium mastigophorum
Clasterosporium microscopicum
Clasterosporium minus
Clasterosporium mori
Clasterosporium negeri
Clasterosporium nitens
Clasterosporium obclavatum
Clasterosporium ontariense
Clasterosporium ovoideum
Clasterosporium parasiticum
Clasterosporium pistaciae
Clasterosporium polypodii
Clasterosporium populi
Clasterosporium proteae
Clasterosporium psilosporoides
Clasterosporium pulchrum
Clasterosporium pulvinatum
Clasterosporium punctatum
Clasterosporium punctiforme
Clasterosporium pyrosporum
Clasterosporium radicicola
Clasterosporium resinae
Clasterosporium roupalae
Clasterosporium sarcopodioides
Clasterosporium scleriae
Clasterosporium sigmoideum
Clasterosporium sparsum
Clasterosporium stevensii
Clasterosporium strepsiceras
Clasterosporium strumarum
Clasterosporium subulatum
Clasterosporium tamaricinum
Clasterosporium therryanum
Clasterosporium toruloides
Clasterosporium toruloideum
Clasterosporium traversoanum
Clasterosporium tripartitum
Clasterosporium typhicola
Clasterosporium uncinatum
Clasterosporium zeae

References

External links 

Sordariomycetes genera
Magnaporthales